Arauco or Araucanía may refer to:

Places 
 Araucanía Region, an administrative region of Chile, the heartland of the historic region of Araucania
 Araucanía (historic region), a historical region of Central Chile also called Arauco 
 Arauco, Chile, a city and municipality in Arauco Province, Chile
 Arauco Peninsula
 Arauco Province, a province in the Biobío Region of Chile
 Arauco Department, Chile
 Arauco, La Rioja, Argentina
 Arauco Department, La Rioja, an administrative entity in La Rioja Province, Argentina
 Gulf of Arauco, a body of water on the coast of Chile

Biology 
 Arauco (moth)
 Araucania (wasp)
 Araucaria araucana, the Arauco pine

Other uses 
 Celulosa Arauco y Constitución (CELCO), a wood pulp and forestry enterprise in Chile

See also
 Arauco War, a centuries-long a war in Chile involving Spaniards and Mapuches